"Poor Baby" is a song by Australian hard rock group The Angels, released in August 1980 as the second single from their fourth studio album, Dark Room. The song peaked at number 72 on the Kent Music Report Singles Chart. The song was written by the Brewster Brothers, John and Rick Brewster.

Track listing 
 EPIC ES482
 Poor Baby (Doc Neeson, John Brewster, Rick Brewster) – 4:03
 I'm Scared (Live) (Doc Neeson, John Brewster, Rick Brewster) – 4:28

Personnel 
 Doc Neeson - vocals 
 Rick Brewster - lead guitar
 John Brewster - rhythm guitar
 Chris Bailey - bass guitar
 Graham "Buzz" Bidstrup  - drums
 Dave Marett, Dave Cafe, Mark Opitz – engineer
 Graham Bidstrup* (tracks: 1), John Brewster, Rick Brewster – producer
 John Brewster, Doc Neeson, Rick Brewster - writers (tracks: 1 & 2)

Charts

References 

The Angels (Australian band) songs
1980 songs
1980 singles
Songs written by John Brewster (musician)
Epic Records singles
Songs written by Doc Neeson